Biblical Hebrew (or), also called Classical Hebrew, is an archaic form of the Hebrew language, a language in the Canaanite branch of Semitic languages spoken by the Israelites in the area known as the Land of Israel, roughly west of the Jordan River and east of the Mediterranean Sea. Judaean), but the name was used in Ancient Greek and Mishnaic Hebrew texts.

The Hebrew language is attested in inscriptions from about the 10th century BCE, and spoken Hebrew persisted through and beyond the Second Temple period, which ended in the siege of Jerusalem (70 CE). It eventually developed into Mishnaic Hebrew, spoken up until the fifth century CE.

Biblical Hebrew as recorded in the Hebrew Bible reflects various stages of the Hebrew language in its consonantal skeleton, as well as a vocalization system which was added in the Middle Ages by the Masoretes. 
There is also some evidence of regional dialectal variation, including differences between Biblical Hebrew as spoken in the northern Kingdom of Israel and in the southern Kingdom of Judah. The consonantal text was transmitted in manuscript form, and underwent redaction in the Second Temple period, but its earliest portions (parts of Amos, Isaiah, Hosea and Micah) can be dated to the late 8th to early 7th centuries BCE.

Biblical Hebrew has been written with a number of different writing systems. From around the 12th century BCE until the 6th century BCE the Hebrews used the Paleo-Hebrew alphabet. This was retained by the Samaritans, who use the descendent Samaritan script to this day. However, the Imperial Aramaic alphabet gradually displaced the Paleo-Hebrew alphabet after the exile to Babylon, and it became the source for the Modern Hebrew alphabet. All of these scripts were lacking letters to represent all of the sounds of Biblical Hebrew, although these sounds are reflected in Greek and Latin transcriptions/translations of the time. These scripts originally indicated only consonants, but certain letters, known by the Latin term matres lectionis, became increasingly used to mark vowels. In the Middle Ages, various systems of diacritics were developed to mark the vowels in Hebrew manuscripts; of these, only the Tiberian vocalization is still in wide use.

Biblical Hebrew possessed a series of emphatic consonants whose precise articulation is disputed, likely ejective or pharyngealized. Earlier Biblical Hebrew possessed three consonants which did not have their own letters in the writing system, but over time they merged with other consonants. The stop consonants developed fricative allophones under the influence of Aramaic, and these sounds eventually became marginally phonemic. The pharyngeal and glottal consonants underwent weakening in some regional dialects, as reflected in the modern Samaritan Hebrew reading tradition. The vowel system of Biblical Hebrew changed over time and is reflected differently in the ancient Greek and Latin transcriptions, medieval vocalization systems, and modern reading traditions.

Biblical Hebrew had a typical Semitic morphology with nonconcatenative morphology, arranging Semitic roots into patterns to form words. Biblical Hebrew distinguished two genders (masculine, feminine), three numbers (singular, plural, and uncommonly, dual). Verbs were marked for voice and mood, and had two conjugations which may have indicated aspect and/or tense (a matter of debate). The tense or aspect of verbs was also influenced by the conjugation , in the so-called waw-consecutive construction. Unlike modern Hebrew, the default word order for biblical Hebrew was verb–subject–object, and verbs inflected for the number, gender, and person of their subject. Pronominal suffixes could be appended to verbs (to indicate object) or nouns (to indicate possession), and nouns had special construct states for use in possessive constructions.

Nomenclature 

The earliest written sources refer to Biblical Hebrew as  "the language of Canaan". The Hebrew Bible also calls the language  "Judaean, Judahite" In the Hellenistic period, Greek writings use the names Hebraios, Hebraïsti and in Mishnaic Hebrew we find  'Hebrew' and  "Hebrew language". The origin of this term is obscure; suggested origins include the biblical Eber, the ethnonyms Ḫabiru, Ḫapiru, and ˁApiru found in sources from Egypt and the near east, and a derivation from the root  "to pass" alluding to crossing over the Jordan River. Jews also began referring to Hebrew as  "the Holy Tongue" in Mishnaic Hebrew.

The term Classical Hebrew may include all pre-medieval dialects of Hebrew, including Mishnaic Hebrew, or it may be limited to Hebrew contemporaneous with the Hebrew Bible. The term Biblical Hebrew refers to pre-Mishnaic dialects (sometimes excluding Dead Sea Scroll Hebrew). The term Biblical Hebrew may or may not include extra-biblical texts, such as inscriptions (e.g. the Siloam inscription), and generally also includes later vocalization traditions for the Hebrew Bible's consonantal text, most commonly the early medieval Tiberian vocalization.

History 

The archeological record for the prehistory of Biblical Hebrew is far more complete than the record of Biblical Hebrew itself. Early Northwest Semitic (ENWS) materials are attested from 2350 BCE to 1200 BCE, the end of the Bronze Age. The Northwest Semitic languages, including Hebrew, differentiated noticeably during the Iron Age (1200–540 BCE), although in its earliest stages Biblical Hebrew was not highly differentiated from Ugaritic and the Canaanite of the Amarna letters.

Hebrew developed during the latter half of the second millennium BCE between the Jordan and the Mediterranean Sea, an area known as Canaan. The Israelite tribes established a kingdom in Canaan at the beginning of the first millennium BCE, which later split into the kingdom of Israel in the north and the kingdom of Judah in the south after a disputed succession. 

The kingdom of Israel was destroyed by the Assyrians in 722 BCE. The kingdom of Judah was conquered by the Babylonians in 586 BCE. The upper classes were exiled into the Babylonian captivity and Solomon's Temple was destroyed. Later the Persians made Judah a province and permitted Jewish exiles to return and rebuild the Temple. According to the Gemara, Hebrew of this period was similar to Imperial Aramaic; Hanina bar Hama said that God sent the exiled Jews to Babylon because "[the Babylonian] language is akin to the Leshon Hakodesh".

Aramaic became the common language in the north, in Galilee and Samaria. Hebrew remained in use in Judah; however the returning exiles brought back Aramaic influence, and Aramaic was used for communicating with other ethnic groups during the Persian period. Alexander conquered Judah in 332 BCE, beginning the period of Hellenistic (Greek) domination. During the Hellenistic period Judea became independent under the Hasmonean dynasty, but later the Romans ended their independence, making Herod the Great their governor. One Jewish revolt against the Romans led to the destruction of the Second Temple in 70 CE, and the second Bar Kokhba revolt in 132–135 led to a large departure of the Jewish population of Judea.

Biblical Hebrew after the Second Temple period evolved into Mishnaic Hebrew, which ceased being spoken and developed into a literary language around 200 CE. Hebrew continued to be used as a literary and liturgical language in the form of Medieval Hebrew, and Hebrew began a revival process in the 19th century, culminating in Modern Hebrew becoming the official language of Israel. Currently, Classical Hebrew is generally taught in public schools in Israel, and Biblical Hebrew forms are sometimes used in Modern Hebrew literature, much as archaic and biblical constructions are used in Modern English literature. Since Modern Hebrew contains many biblical elements, Biblical Hebrew is fairly intelligible to Modern Hebrew speakers.

The primary source of Biblical Hebrew material is the Hebrew Bible. Epigraphic materials from the area of Israelite territory are written in a form of Hebrew called Inscriptional Hebrew, although this is meagerly attested. According to Waltke & O'Connor, Inscriptional Hebrew "is not strikingly different from the Hebrew preserved in the Masoretic text." The damp climate of Israel caused the rapid deterioration of papyrus and parchment documents, in contrast to the dry environment of Egypt, and the survival of the Hebrew Bible may be attributed to scribal determination in preserving the text through copying. No manuscript of the Hebrew Bible dates to before 400 BCE, although two silver rolls (the Ketef Hinnom scrolls) from the seventh or sixth century BCE show a version of the Priestly Blessing. Vowel and cantillation marks were added to the older consonantal layer of the Bible between 600 CE and the beginning of the 10th century. The scholars who preserved the pronunciation of the Bibles were known as the Masoretes. The most well-preserved system that was developed, and the only one still in religious use, is the Tiberian vocalization, but both Babylonian and Palestinian vocalizations are also attested. The Palestinian system was preserved mainly in piyyutim, which contain biblical quotations.

Classification 

Biblical Hebrew is a Northwest Semitic language from the Canaanite subgroup.

As Biblical Hebrew evolved from the Proto-Semitic language it underwent a number of consonantal mergers parallel with those in other Canaanite languages. There is no evidence that these mergers occurred after the adaptation of the Hebrew alphabet.

Case endings are found in Northwest Semitic languages in the second millennium BCE, but disappear almost totally afterwards. Mimation is absent in singular nouns, but is often retained in the plural, as in Hebrew.

The Northwest Semitic languages formed a dialect continuum in the Iron Age (1200–540 BCE), with Phoenician and Aramaic on each extreme. Hebrew is classed with Phoenician in the Canaanite subgroup, which also includes Ammonite, Edomite, and Moabite. Moabite might be considered a Hebrew dialect, though it possessed distinctive Aramaic features. Although Ugaritic shows a large degree of affinity to Hebrew in poetic structure, vocabulary, and some grammar, it lacks some Canaanite features (like the Canaanite shift and the shift  > ), and its similarities are more likely a result of either contact or preserved archaism.

Hebrew also shares with the Canaanite languages the shifts  > ,  and  > , widespread reduction of diphthongs, and full assimilation of non-final /n/ to the following consonant if word final, i.e.  /bat/ from *bant. There is also evidence of a rule of assimilation of /y/ to the following coronal consonant in pre-tonic position, shared by Hebrew, Phoenician and Aramaic.

Typical Canaanite words in Hebrew include:  "roof"  "table"  "window"  "old (thing)"  "old (person)" and  "expel". Morphological Canaanite features in Hebrew include the masculine plural marker , first person singular pronoun , interrogative pronoun , definite article  (appearing in the first millennium BCE), and third person plural feminine verbal marker .

Eras 
Biblical Hebrew as preserved in the Hebrew Bible is composed of multiple linguistic layers. The consonantal skeleton of the text is the most ancient, while the vocalization and cantillation are later additions reflecting a later stage of the language. These additions were added after 600 CE; Hebrew had already ceased being used as a spoken language around 200 CE. Biblical Hebrew as reflected in the consonantal text of the Bible and in extra-biblical inscriptions may be subdivided by era.

The oldest form of Biblical Hebrew, Archaic Hebrew, is found in poetic sections of the Bible and inscriptions dating to around 1000 BCE, the early Monarchic Period. This stage is also known as Old Hebrew or Paleo-Hebrew, and is the oldest stratum of Biblical Hebrew. The oldest known artifacts of Archaic Biblical Hebrew are various sections of the Tanakh, including the Song of Moses (Exodus 15) and the Song of Deborah (Judges 5). Biblical poetry uses a number of distinct lexical items, for example  for prose  'see',  for  'great'. Some have cognates in other Northwest Semitic languages, for example  'do' and  'gold' which are common in Canaanite and Ugaritic.

Later pre-exilic Biblical Hebrew (such as is found in prose sections of the Pentateuch, Nevi'im, and some Ketuvim) is known as 'Biblical Hebrew proper' or 'Standard Biblical Hebrew'. This is dated to the period from the 8th to the 6th century BCE. In contrast to Archaic Hebrew, Standard Biblical Hebrew is more consistent in using the definite article , the accusative marker , distinguishing between simple and waw-consecutive verb forms, and in using particles like  and  rather than asyndeton.

Biblical Hebrew from after the Babylonian exile in 587 BCE is known as 'Late Biblical Hebrew'. Late Biblical Hebrew shows Aramaic influence in phonology, morphology, and lexicon, and this trend is also evident in the later-developed Tiberian vocalization system.

Qumran Hebrew, attested in the Dead Sea Scrolls from ca. 200 BCE to 70 CE, is a continuation of Late Biblical Hebrew. Qumran Hebrew may be considered an intermediate stage between Biblical Hebrew and Mishnaic Hebrew, though Qumran Hebrew shows its own idiosyncratic dialectal features.

Dialects 
Dialect variation in Biblical Hebrew is attested to by the well-known shibboleth incident of Judges 12:6, where Jephthah's forces from Gilead caught Ephraimites trying to cross the Jordan river by making them say  šibboleṯ ('ear of corn') The Ephraimites' identity was given away by their pronunciation:  sibboleṯ. The apparent conclusion is that the Ephraimite dialect had  for standard . Gileadite) but not others (e.g. Ephraimite), where *s1 and *s3 merged into /s/.

Hebrew as spoken in the northern Kingdom of Israel, known also as Israelian Hebrew, shows phonological, lexical, and grammatical differences from southern dialects. The Northern dialect spoken around Samaria shows more frequent simplification of  into  as attested by the Samaria ostraca (8th century BCE), e.g. (=  <  'wine'), while the Southern (Judean) dialect instead adds in an epenthetic vowel /i/, added halfway through the first millennium BCE ( = ). The word play in Amos 8:1–2  may reflect this: given that Amos was addressing the population of the Northern Kingdom, the vocalization *קֵיץ would be more forceful. The Samaria ostraca also show  for standard  'year', as in Aramaic.

The guttural phonemes  merged over time in some dialects. This was found in Dead Sea Scroll Hebrew, but Jerome attested to the existence of contemporaneous Hebrew speakers who still distinguished pharyngeals.

Orthography 

The earliest Hebrew writing yet discovered, found at Khirbet Qeiyafa, dates to the 10th century BCE. The 15 cm x 16.5 cm (5.9 in x 6.5 in) trapezoid pottery sherd (ostracon) has five lines of text written in ink written in the Proto-Canaanite alphabet (the old form which predates both the Paleo-Hebrew and Phoenician alphabets). The tablet is written from left to right, indicating that Hebrew writing was still in the formative stage.

The Israelite tribes who settled in the land of Israel used a late form of the Proto-Sinaitic Alphabet (known as Proto-Canaanite when found in Israel) around the 12th century BCE, which developed into Early Phoenician and Early Paleo-Hebrew as found in the Gezer calendar. This script developed into the Paleo-Hebrew script in the 10th or 9th centuries BCE. The Paleo-Hebrew alphabet's main differences from the Phoenician script were "a curving to the left of the downstrokes in the "long-legged" letter-signs... the consistent use of a Waw with a concave top, [and an] x-shaped Taw." The oldest inscriptions in Paleo-Hebrew script are dated to around the middle of the 9th century BCE, the most famous being the Mesha Stele in the Moabite language (which might be considered a dialect of Hebrew). The ancient Hebrew script was in continuous use until the early 6th century BCE, the end of the First Temple period. In the Second Temple Period the Paleo-Hebrew script gradually fell into disuse, and was completely abandoned among the Jews after the failed Bar Kochba revolt. The Samaritans retained the ancient Hebrew alphabet, which evolved into the modern Samaritan alphabet.

By the end of the First Temple period the Aramaic script, a separate descendant of the Phoenician script, became widespread throughout the region, gradually displacing Paleo-Hebrew. The oldest documents that have been found in the Aramaic Script are fragments of the scrolls of Exodus, Samuel, and Jeremiah found among the Dead Sea scrolls, dating from the late 3rd and early 2nd centuries BCE. It seems that the earlier biblical books were originally written in the Paleo-Hebrew script, while the later books were written directly in the later Assyrian script. Some Qumran texts written in the Assyrian script write the tetragrammaton and some other divine names in Paleo-Hebrew, and this practice is also found in several Jewish-Greek biblical translations. While spoken Hebrew continued to evolve into Mishnaic Hebrew, the scribal tradition for writing the Torah gradually developed. A number of regional "book-hand" styles developed for the purpose of Torah manuscripts and occasionally other literary works, distinct from the calligraphic styles used mainly for private purposes. The Mizrahi and Ashkenazi book-hand styles were later adapted to printed fonts after the invention of the printing press. The modern Hebrew alphabet, also known as the Assyrian or Square script, is a descendant of the Aramaic alphabet.

The Phoenician script had dropped five characters by the 12th century BCE, reflecting the language's twenty-two consonantal phonemes. As a result, the 22 letters of the Paleo-Hebrew alphabet numbered less than the consonant phonemes of ancient Biblical Hebrew; in particular, the letters  could each mark two different phonemes. After a sound shift the letters ,  could only mark one phoneme, but (except in Samaritan Hebrew)  still marked two.

While no examples of early Hebrew orthography have been found, older Phoenician and Moabite texts show how First Temple period Hebrew would have been written. Matres lectionis were later added word-finally, for instance the Mesha inscription has  for later ; however at this stage they were not yet used word-medially, compare Siloam inscription  versus  (for later ). The relative terms defective and full/plene are used to refer to alternative spellings of a word with less or more matres lectionis, respectively.

The Hebrew Bible was presumably originally written in a more defective orthography than found in any of the texts known today. Of the extant textual witnesses of the Hebrew Bible, the Masoretic text is generally the most conservative in its use of matres lectionis, with the Samaritan Pentateuch and its forebearers being more full and the Qumran tradition showing the most liberal use of vowel letters. The Masoretic text mostly uses vowel letters for long vowels, showing the tendency to mark all long vowels except for word-internal . , sometimes .  is found finally in forms like  (Tiberian ),  (Tiberian ) while  may be used for an a-quality vowel in final position (e.g. ) and in medial position (e.g. ). Pre-Samaritan and Samaritan texts show full spellings in many categories (e.g.  vs. Masoretic  in Genesis 49:3) but only rarely show full spelling of the Qumran type.

In general the vowels of Biblical Hebrew were not indicated in the original text, but various sources attest them at various stages of development. Greek and Latin transcriptions of words from the biblical text provide early evidence of the nature of Biblical Hebrew vowels. In particular, there is evidence from the rendering of proper nouns in the Koine Greek Septuagint (3rd–2nd centuries BCE) and the Greek alphabet transcription of the Hebrew biblical text contained in the Secunda (3rd century CE, likely a copy of a preexisting text from before 100 BCE). In the 7th and 8th centuries CE various systems of vocalic notation were developed to indicate vowels in the biblical text. The most prominent, best preserved, and the only system still in use, is the Tiberian vocalization system, created by scholars known as Masoretes around 850 CE. There are also various extant manuscripts making use of less common vocalization systems (Babylonian and Palestinian), known as superlinear vocalizations because their vocalization marks are placed above the letters. In addition, the Samaritan reading tradition is independent of these systems, and was occasionally notated with a separate vocalization system. All of these systems together are used to reconstruct the original vocalization of Biblical Hebrew.

At an early stage, in documents written in the paleo-Hebrew script, words were divided by short vertical lines and later by dots, as reflected by the Mesha Stone, the Siloam inscription, the Ophel inscription, and paleo-Hebrew script documents from Qumran. Word division was not used in Phoenician inscriptions; however, there is not direct evidence for biblical texts being written without word division, as suggested by Nahmanides in his introduction to the Torah. Word division using spaces was commonly used from the beginning of the 7th century BCE for documents in the Aramaic script. In addition to marking vowels, the Tiberian system also uses cantillation marks, which serve to mark word stress, semantic structure, and the musical motifs used in formal recitation of the text.

While the Tiberian, Babylonian, and Palestinian reading traditions are extinct, various other systems of pronunciation have evolved over time, notably the Yemenite, Sephardi, Ashkenazi, and Samaritan traditions. Modern Hebrew pronunciation is also used by some to read biblical texts. The modern reading traditions do not stem solely from the Tiberian system; for instance, the Sephardic tradition's distinction between qamatz gadol and qatan is pre-Tiberian. However, the only orthographic system used to mark vowels is the Tiberian vocalization.

Phonology 
The phonology as reconstructed for Biblical Hebrew is as follows:

Consonants 
Consonants lost and gained during the lifetime of Biblical Hebrew are color-coded respectively.

The phonetic nature of some Biblical Hebrew consonants is disputed. The so-called "emphatics" were likely pharyngealized, but possibly ejective or velarized. The pharyngealization of emphatic consonants is viewed as a Central Semitic innovation.

Some argue that  were affricated, but Egyptian starts using s in place of earlier ṯ to represent Canaanite s around 1000 BC. It is likely that Canaanite was already dialectally split by that time and the northern, Early Phoenician dialect that the Greeks were in contact with could have preserved the affricate pronunciation until  at least, unlike the more southern Canaanite dialects (like Hebrew) that the Egyptians were in contact with, so that there is no contradiction.

Originally, the Hebrew letters  and  each represented two possible phonemes, uvular and pharyngeal, with the distinction unmarked in Hebrew orthography. However the uvular phonemes   and   merged with their pharyngeal counterparts   and   respectively c. 200 BCE.

This is observed by noting that these phonemes are distinguished consistently in the Septuagint of the Pentateuch (e.g. Isaac  =  versus Rachel  = ), but this becomes more sporadic in later books and is generally absent in Ezra and Nehemiah.

This probably happened after the original Old Aramaic phonemes  disappeared in the 7th century BCE, and most likely occurred after the loss of Hebrew  c. 200 BCE. It is known to have occurred in Hebrew by the 2nd century CE. After a certain point this alternation became contrastive in word-medial and final position (though bearing low functional load), but in word-initial position they remained allophonic. This is evidenced both by the Tiberian vocalization's consistent use of word-initial spirants after a vowel in sandhi, as well as Rabbi Saadia Gaon's attestation to the use of this alternation in Tiberian Aramaic at the beginning of the 10th century CE.

The Dead Sea scrolls show evidence of confusion of the phonemes , e.g.  ħmr for Masoretic   'he said'. However the testimony of Jerome indicates that this was a regionalism and not universal. Confusion of gutturals was also attested in later Mishnaic Hebrew and Aramaic (see Eruvin 53b).

Geminate consonants are phonemically contrastive in Biblical Hebrew. In the Secunda  are never geminate.

Vowels 
The vowel system of Biblical Hebrew has changed considerably over time. The following vowels are those reconstructed for the earliest stage of Hebrew, those attested by the Secunda, those of the various vocalization traditions (Tiberian and varieties of Babylonian and Palestinian), and those of the Samaritan tradition, with vowels absent in some traditions color-coded.

Sound changes 

The following sections present the vowel changes that Biblical Hebrew underwent, in approximate chronological order.

Proto-Central-Semitic 
Proto-Semitic is the ancestral language of all the Semitic languages, and in traditional reconstructions possessed 29 consonants; 6 monophthong vowels, consisting of three qualities and two lengths, in which the long vowels occurred only in open syllables; and two diphthongs . The stress system of Proto-Semitic is unknown but it is commonly described as being much like the system of Classical Latin or the modern pronunciation of Classical Arabic: If the penultimate (second last) syllable is light (has a short vowel followed by a single consonant), stress goes on the antepenult (third to last); otherwise, it goes on the penult.

Various changes, mostly in morphology, took place between Proto-Semitic and Proto-Central-Semitic, the language at the root of the Central Semitic languages. The phonemic system was inherited essentially unchanged, but the emphatic consonants may have changed their realization in Central Semitic from ejectives to pharyngealized consonants.

The morphology of Proto-Central-Semitic shows significant changes compared with Proto-Semitic, especially in its verbs, and is much like in Classical Arabic. Nouns in the singular were usually declined in three cases: /-u/ (nominative), /-a/ (accusative) or /-i/ (genitive). In some circumstances (but never in the construct state), nouns also took a final nasal after the case ending: nunation (final /-n/) occurred in some languages, mimation (final /-m/) in others. The original meaning of this marker is uncertain. In Classical Arabic, final /-n/ on nouns indicates indefiniteness and disappears when the noun is preceded by a definite article or otherwise becomes definite in meaning. In other languages, final /-n/ may be present whenever a noun is not in the construct state. Old Canaanite had mimation, of uncertain meaning, in an occurrence of the word urušalemim (Jerusalem) as given in an Egyptian transcription.

Broken plural forms in Arabic are declined like singulars, and often take singular agreement as well. Dual and "strong plural" forms use endings with a long vowel or diphthong, declined in only two cases: nominative and objective (combination accusative/genitive), with the objective form often becoming the default one after the loss of case endings. Both Hebrew and Arabic had a special form of nunation/mimation that co-occurred with the dual and masculine sound plural endings whenever the noun was not in the construct state. The endings were evidently felt as an inherent part of the ending and, as a result, are still used. Examples are Arabic strong masculine plural -ūna (nominative), -īna (objective), and dual endings -āni (nominative), -ayni (objective); corresponding construct-state endings are -ū, -ī (strong masculine plural), -ā, -ay (dual). (The strong feminine endings in Classical Arabic are -ātu nominative, -āti objective, marked with a singular-style -n nunation in the indefinite state only.)

Hebrew has almost lost the broken plural (if it ever had it), and any vestigial forms that may remain have been extended with the strong plural endings. The dual and strong plural endings were likely much like the Arabic forms given above at one point, with only the objective-case forms ultimately surviving. For example, dual -ayim is probably from *-aymi with an extended mimation ending (cf. Arabic -ayni above), while dual construct -ē is from *-ay without mimation. Similarly, -īm < *-īma, -ōt < *-āti. (Note that expected plural construct state *-ī was replaced by dual -ē.)

Feminine nouns at this point ended in a suffix /-at-/ or /-t-/ and took normal case endings. When the ending /-at-/ became final because of loss or non-presence of the case ending, both Hebrew and Arabic show a later shift to /-ah/ and then . The final /t/ consonant therefore is silent in the absolute state, but becomes /t/ again in the construct state and when these words take suffixes, e.g. תֹורָה /toːraː/ "law" becomes תֹורַת /toːrat/ "law of", and תֹורָתְךָ /toːraːtəxaː/ "your law", etc. (This is equivalent to the Arabic letter Tāʼ Marbūṭah ة, a modified final form of the letter He ه which indicates this same phoneme shifting, and only its pronunciation varies between construct and absolute state.)

Canaanite shift 
This shift had occurred by the 14th century BCE, as demonstrated by its presence in the Amarna letters.

Proto-Hebrew 
Furthermore, stress at this point appears to have shifted so that it was consistently on the penultimate (next to last) syllable, and was still non-phonemic. The predominant final stress of Biblical Hebrew was a result of loss of final unstressed vowels and a shift away from remaining open syllables (see below).

Loss of final unstressed vowels 
Final unstressed short vowels dropped out in most words, making it possible for long vowels to occur in closed syllables.
This appears to have proceeded in two steps:
Final short mood, etc. markers dropped in verbal forms.
Final short case markers dropped in nominal forms.
Vowel lengthening in stressed, open syllables occurred between the two steps, with the result that short vowels at the beginning of a -VCV ending lengthened in nouns but not verbs. This is most noticeable with short : e.g. *kataba ('he wrote') >  but *dabara ('word' acc.') > .

The dropping of final short vowels in verb forms tended to erase mood distinctions, but also some gender distinctions; however, unexpected vowel lengthening occurred in many situations to preserve the distinctions. For example, in the suffix conjugation, first-singular *-tu appears to have been remade into *-tī already by Proto-Hebrew on the basis of possessive -ī (likewise first singular personal pronoun *ʔana became *ʔanī).

Similarly, in the second-singular, inherited *-ta -ti competed with lengthened *-tā -tī for masculine and feminine forms. The expected result would be -t or -tā for masculine, -t or -tī for feminine, and in fact both variants of both forms are found in the Bible (with -h marking the long -ā and -y marking the long -ī). The situation appears to have been quite fluid for several centuries, with -t and -tā/tī forms found in competition both in writing and in speech (cf. the Secunda (Hexapla) of Origen, which records both pronunciations, although quite often in disagreement with the written form as passed down to us). Ultimately, writing stabilized on the shorter -t for both genders, while speech chose feminine -t but masculine -tā. This is the reason for the unexpected qamatz vowel written under the final letter of such words.

The exact same process affected possessive *-ka ('your' masc. sing.) and *-ki ('your' fem. sing.), and personal pronouns *ʔanta, *ʔanti, with the same split into shorter and longer forms and the same ultimate resolution.

Short vowel lengthening (esp. pretonic), lowering 
The short vowels  tended to lengthen in various positions.
First, short vowels lengthened in an open syllable in pretonic position (i.e. directly before the stressed syllable).
Later, short vowels lengthened in stressed open syllables.
In the process of lengthening, the high vowels were lowered.

Reduction of short open stressed syllables 
Stress was originally penultimate and loss of final short vowels made many words have final stress. However, words whose final syllable had a long vowel or ended with a consonant were unaffected and still had penultimate stress at this point. This change did not happen in pausal position, where the penultimate stress is preserved, and vowel lengthening rather than reduction occurs.

The previous three changes occurred in a complex, interlocking fashion:

 Shift of stress to be universally penultimate.
 Loss of final short vowels in verbs, pre-stress lengthening in open syllables. Pre-stress lengthening/lowering becomes a surface filter that remains as a rule in the language, automatically affected any new short vowels in open syllables as they appear (but ultra-short vowels are unaffected).
 Stress movement from light syllable to following heavy syllable when not in pausa, with newly unstressed light syllable reducing the schwa.
 Tonic lengthening/lowering in open syllables.
 Loss of final short vowels in nouns.

Examples:

Note that many, perhaps most, Hebrew words with a schwa directly before a final stress are due to this stress shift.

This sound change shifted many more originally penultimate-stressed words to have final stress. The above changes can be seen to divide words into a number of main classes based on stress and syllable properties:

 Proto-Hebrew words with an open penult and short-vowel ending: Become final-stressed (e.g.  ('he killed') <  PHeb. ).
 Proto-Hebrew words with a closed penult and short-vowel ending: Become penultimate due to segholate rule (e.g.  ('king') < ).
 Proto-Hebrew words with an open short penult and longer ending: Become final-stressed due to stress shift (e.g.  ('they killed') <  PHeb. ).
 Proto-Hebrew words with a closed penult and longer ending: Remain penultimate (e.g.  ('I killed') <  PHeb. ).
 Proto-Hebrew words with an open long penult and longer ending: ???

Pre-stress reduction of short vowel 

Later developments 
The later Jewish traditions (Tiberian, Babylonian, Palestinian) show similar vowel developments. By the Tiberian time, all short vowels in stressed syllables and open pretonic lengthened, making vowel length allophonic. The Babylonian and Palestinian vocalizations systems also do not mark vowel length. In the Tiberian and Babylonian systems,  and lengthened  become the back vowel . In the Tiberian tradition pretonic vowels are reduced more commonly than in the Secunda. 'open place' < ). In Tiberian Hebrew pretonic  is most commonly preserved by geminating the following consonant, e.g. ('red' pl.) (cf. 'red' sg.); this pretonic gemination is also found in some forms with other vowels like ⁓  ('prisoner').

The Babylonian and Palestinian systems have only one reduced vowel phoneme  like the Secunda, though in Palestinian Hebrew it developed the pronunciation . However the Tiberian tradition possesses three reduced vowels  of which  has questionable phonemicity.  under a non-guttural letter was pronounced as an ultrashort copy of the following vowel before a guttural, e.g. , and as  preceding , e.g. , but was always pronounced as  under gutturals, e.g. . When reduced, etymological  become  under gutturals (e.g. 'you [mp.] said' cf. Samaritan and Qumran Hebrew have full vowels in place of the reduced vowels of Tiberian Hebrew.

Samaritan Hebrew also does not reflect etymological vowel length; however the elision of guttural consonants has created new phonemic vowel length, e.g. ('great') vs.   ('wide'). Samaritan Hebrew vowels are allophonically lengthened (to a lesser degree) in open syllables, e.g. Pretonic gemination is also found in Samaritan Hebrew, but not always in the same locations as in Tiberian Hebrew, e.g. TH  SH ;  TH  SH . The reduced vowels of the other traditions appear as full vowels, though there may be evidence that Samaritan Hebrew once had similar vowel reduction. ('house')   ('the house')    .

Various more specific conditioned shifts of vowel quality have also occurred. Diphthongs were frequently monophthongized, but the scope and results of this shift varied among dialects. In particular, the Samaria ostraca show  <  <  for Southern  ('wine'), and Samaritan Hebrew shows instead the shift  > . This was carried through completely in Samaritan Hebrew but met more resistance in other traditions such as the Babylonian and Qumran traditions. This is absent in the transcriptions of the Secunda, but there is evidence that the law's onset predates the Secunda. In the Samaritan tradition Philippi's law is applied consistently, e.g.  >  ('heart'). It is common in the Tiberian tradition, e.g.  > Tiberian   ('seven'), but exceptions are frequent. It is less common in the Babylonian vocalization, e.g. ('seven'), and differences in Greek and Latin transcriptions demonstrate that it began quite late. Attenuation generally did not occur before , e.g. Tiberian   ('key') versus   ('opening [construct]'), and often was blocked before a geminate, e.g. ('gift'). Attenuation is rarely present in Samaritan Hebrew, e.g.  . In the Tiberian tradition  take offglide  before . This is absent in the Secunda and in Samaritan Hebrew but present in the transcriptions of Jerome. In the Tiberian tradition an ultrashort echo vowel is sometimes added to clusters where the first element is a guttural, e.g. ('he will listen')   ('his work') but   ('he will make glorious')   'its breadth'.

The following charts summarize the most common reflexes of the Proto-Semitic vowels in the various stages of Hebrew:

 under the conditions of the law of attenuation
 under the conditions of Phillipi's law
 Samaritan  are nearly in complementary distribution ( in open syllables,  in closed syllables)
 lengthening occurs in some open pretonic syllables and some stressed syllables; precise conditions depend on the vowel and on the tradition
 reduction occurs in the open syllables two syllables away from the stress and sometimes also in pretonic and stressed open syllables
 effectively in most closed syllables
 more common before geminate consonants
 Samaritan Hebrew has full vowels when the other traditions have reduced vowels, but these do not always correlate with their Proto-Hebrew ancestors

Stress 
Proto-Hebrew generally had penultimate stress. The ultimate stress of later traditions of Hebrew usually resulted from the loss of final vowels in many words, preserving the location of proto-Semitic stress. Tiberian Hebrew has phonemic stress, e.g.   ('they built') vs.   ('in us'); stress is most commonly ultimate, less commonly penultimate, and antipenultimate stress exists marginally, e.g.   ('into the tent'). There does not seem to be evidence for stress in the Secunda varying from that of the Tiberian tradition. Despite sharing the loss of final vowels with Tiberian Hebrew, Samaritan Hebrew has generally not preserved Proto-Semitic stress, and has predominantly penultimate stress, with occasional ultimate stress. There is evidence that Qumran Hebrew had a similar stress pattern to Samaritan Hebrew.

Grammar 
Medieval grammarians of Arabic and Hebrew classified words as belonging to three parts of speech: Arabic ism ('noun'), fiʻl ('verb'), and ḥarf ('particle'); other grammarians have included more categories. In particular, adjectives and nouns show more affinity to each other than in most European languages. Biblical Hebrew has a typical Semitic morphology, characterized by the use of roots. Most words in Biblical Hebrew are formed from a root, a sequence of consonants with a general associated meaning. Roots are usually triconsonantal, with biconsonantal roots less common (depending on how some words are analyzed) and rare cases of quadri- and quinquiconsonantal roots.  Roots are modified by affixation to form words. Verbal patterns are more productive and consistent, while noun patterns are less predictable.

Nouns and adjectives 

The prefix  is used to denote the action of the verb; it is derived from more common for initial- verbs, e.g. ('thanksgiving'; < ydy). Prefixed  is used in adjectives, e.g. ('deceptive'), and also occurs in nouns with initial sibilants, e.g. ('finger'). In the latter case this prefix was added for phonetic reasons, and the  prefix is called either "prothetic" or "prosthetic". Prefixed  often occurs in quadriliteral animal names, perhaps as a prefix, e.g. ('bat'),  ('mouse'),  ('scorpion').

The Amarna letters show that this was probably still present in Hebrew  In the development of Hebrew, final  were dropped first, and later  was elided as well. Mimation, a nominal suffix  of unclear meaning, was found in early Canaanite, as shown by early Egyptian transcriptions of Jerusalem as Urušalimim, but there is no indication of its presence after 1800 BCE. ('with us'); nouns preserve  in forms like .

Biblical Hebrew has two genders, masculine and feminine, which are reflected in nouns, adjectives, pronouns, and verbs. Hebrew distinguishes between singular and plural numbers, and plural forms may also be used for collectives and honorifics. Hebrew has a morphological dual form for nouns that naturally occur in pairs, and for units of measurement and time this contrasts with the plural ( 'day'  'two days'  'days'). A widespread misconception is that the Hebrew plural denotes three or more objects. In truth, it denotes two or more objects. However adjectives, pronouns, and verbs do not have dual forms, and most nominal dual forms can function as plurals ( 'six wings' from Isaiah 6:2). Finite verbs are marked for subject person, number, and gender. Nouns also have a construct form which is used in genitive constructions.

Nouns are marked as definite with the prefix /ha-/ followed by gemination of the initial consonant of the noun.

The traditions differ on the form of segolate nouns, nouns stemming from roots with two final consonants. The anaptyctic  of the Tiberian tradition in segolates appears in the Septuagint (3rd century BCE) but not the Hexapla (2nd century CE), e.g.   = Γαθερ versus   = Χεσλ (Psalms 49:14). This may reflect dialectal variation or phonetic versus phonemic transcriptions. Both the Palestinian and Babylonian traditions have an anaptyctic vowel in segolates,  in the Palestinian tradition (e.g. 'item' = Tiberian  Jeremiah 22:28). The Qumran tradition sometimes shows some type of back epenthetic vowel when the first vowel is back, e.g.  for Tiberian   ('tent').

Biblical Hebrew has two sets of personal pronouns: the free-standing independent pronouns have a nominative function, while the pronominal suffixes are genitive or accusative. Only the first person suffix has different possessive and objective forms ( and ).

Verbs 
Verbal consonantal roots are placed into derived verbal stems, known as  binyanim in Hebrew; the binyanim mainly serve to indicate grammatical voice. This includes various distinctions of reflexivity, passivity, and causativity. Verbs of all binyanim have three non-finite forms (one participle, two infinitives), three modal forms (cohortative, imperative, jussive), and two major conjugations (prefixing, suffixing). The meaning of the prefixing and suffixing conjugations are also affected by the conjugation , and their meaning with respect to tense and aspect is a matter of debate.

Word order 
The default word order in Biblical Hebrew is commonly thought to be VSO, though one scholar has argued that this is due to the prevalence of clauses with a wayyiqtol verb form compared to other less marked forms that use SVO either more often or at least to a comparable degree. Attributive adjectives normally follow the noun they modify. In Biblical Hebrew, possession is normally expressed with status constructus, a construction in which the possessed noun occurs in a phonologically reduced, "construct" form and is followed by the possessor noun in its normal, "absolute" form. Pronominal direct objects are either suffixed to the verb or alternatively expressed on the object-marking pronoun .

Tense and aspect 
Biblical Hebrew has two main conjugation types, the suffix conjugation, also called the Perfect, and the prefix conjugation, also called Imperfect. The Perfect verb form expressed the idea of the verb as a completed action, viewing it from start to finish as a whole, and not focusing on the process by which the verb came to be completed, stating it as a simple fact. This is often used in the past tense, however there are some contexts in which a Perfect verb translates into the present and future tenses.

The Imperfect portrays the verb as an incomplete action along with the process by which it came about, either as an event that has not begun, an event that has begun but is still in the process, or a habitual or cyclic action that is on an ongoing repetition. The Imperfect can also express modal or conditional verbs, as well as commands in the Jussive and Cohortative moods. It is conjectured that the imperfect can express modal quality through the paragogic nun added to certain imperfect forms. While often future tense, it also has uses in the past and present under certain contexts. Biblical Hebrew tense is not necessarily reflected in the verb forms per se, but rather is determined primarily by context. The Participles also reflect ongoing or continuous actions, but are also subject to the context determining their tense.

The verbal forms can be Past Tense in these circumstances:
 Perfect, Simple Past: in narrative, reflects a simple completed action, perception, emotion or mental process, and can also be past tense from the perspective of a prior verb which is used in future tense
 Imperfect, Waw Consecutive Preterite: simple past tense which takes the וַ prefix as a conjunction, appears at the beginning of a clause when it's connected in a narrative sequence with previous clauses, where the conjunction can be translated as 'and then', 'then', 'but', 'however', sometimes is not translated at all, and can even have a parenthetical function as if suggesting the clause is like a side note to the main focus of the narrative
 Imperfect, Past: reflecting not just a past action but also suggesting the process with which it was being done, e.g.: "I brought the horse to a halt", "I began to hear"
 Imperfect, Cyclic Past: reflecting a habitual or cyclic action over time, e.g. "this is what Job would always do"
 Participle in Past Tense: an active or passive Participle being used in its imperfect verbal sense in the past, e.g. "and the Spirit of God was hovering"
The verbal forms can be Present Tense in these circumstances:
 Perfect, Proverbial/General Present: a general truth in the present tense which is not referring to a specific event, e.g. "the sun sets in the west"
 Perfect, Stative Present: present tense with verbs that depict a state of being rather than an action, including verbs of perception, emotion or mental process, e.g. "I love", "I hate", "I understand", "I know"
 Perfect, Present Perfect: a Present Perfect verb, e.g. "I have walked"
 Imperfect, Present Condition: an Imperfect verb in the present, one which implies that an action has been going on for some time and is still ongoing in the present, especially used of questions in the present, e.g. "what are you seeking?"
 Imperfect, Cyclic Present: an Imperfect verb in the present, reflecting a cyclic action in the present, e.g. "it is being said in the city", "a son makes his father glad"
 Participle in Present Tense: an active or passive Participle being used in its imperfect verbal sense in the present, e.g. "I am going"
The verbal forms can be Future Tense in these circumstances:
 Perfect, Waw Consecutive Future: by analogy to the Preterite, a simple future tense verb which takes the וְ prefix as a conjunction, appears at the beginning of a clause when it's connected in a narrative sequence with previous clauses, where the conjunction can be translated as 'and then', 'then', 'but', 'however', sometimes is not translated at all, and can even have a parenthetical function as if suggesting the clause is like a side note to the main focus of the narrative
 Perfect, Waw Consecutive Subjunctive: takes the וְ prefix as a conjunction to continue the Subjunctive Mood in a narrative sequence
 Perfect, Waw Consecutive Jussive/Cohortative: takes the וְ prefix as a conjunction to continue the Jussive and Cohortative Moods in a narrative sequence
 Perfect, Promise Future: the completeness of the verb form here expresses an imminent action in the context of promises, threats and the language of contracts and covenants in general, e.g. "I will give you this land", "will I have this pleasure?"
 Perfect, Prophetic Future: the completeness of the verb form here expresses an imminent action in the context of prophecy, e.g. "you will go into exile"
 Imperfect, Future: reflects a future event which has not yet come into completion, or one that has not yet begun, or future tense from the perspective of a prior verb which is used in past tense
 Imperfect, Subjunctive: reflects a potential, theoretical or modal verb, such as in conditional clauses, e.g. "If you go...", "she should stay"
 Imperfect, Jussive/Cohortative: reflects a non-immediate command, invitation, permission or wishful request, e.g. "let there be light", "you may eat from the tree", "let's go", "O that someone would get me a drink"

Sample text 
The following is a sample from Psalm 18 as appears in the Masoretic text with medieval Tiberian niqqud and cantillation and the Greek transcription of the Secunda of the Hexapla along with its reconstructed pronunciation.

Notes

References

Bibliography 

.

External links 

Biblical Hebrew Resources
Resources for the Study of Biblical Hebrew, Prof. E. Ben Zvi, University of Alberta
Brown–Driver–Briggs Hebrew Lexicon – with an appendix containing Biblical Aramaic (Wikisource)
Free resources to study Biblical Hebrew online, eHebrew.net
Grammar, vocabulary and writing
The Handy-Dandy Hebrew Grammar Chart, Prof. Shawn Madden, Southeastern Baptist Theological Seminary.
Basic Biblical Hebrew Grammar (introductory)
Learn to write the Biblical Hebrew characters
The Alphabet of Biblical Hebrew

 
Canaanite languages
Hebrew
Hebrew words and phrases
Languages attested from the 10th century BC
Languages extinct in the 1st century
Sacred languages